S. R. Prabhakaran is an Indian film director primarily working in Tamil cinema. He is best known for directing his debut film Sundarapandian. He was the former associate of M. Sasikumar and also he was the former associate of S. D. Saba.

Career
Sundarapandian is a 2012 Indian Tamil-language comedy drama film directed by S. R. Prabhakaran. Sasikumar played the title character, besides producing the film, while Lakshmi Menon, Vijay Sethupathi, Soori, Inigo Prabhakaran and Soundararaja appeared in supporting roles. Music was composed by N. R. Raghunanthan, while cinematography was handled by Premkumar. The film released on 14 September 2012 to overall positive reviews. Following its commercial success, the film was remade in Kannada as Raja Huli and in Telugu as Speedunnodu.

Personal
S. R. Prabhakaran Madurai, Tamil Nadu to K.P.Sooli Ramu and S.Rajalakshmi, He has completed his diploma in Film Science.
S.R.Prabhakaran married Dhivya on 14 July 2013 in Madurai and the couple have a  son named P.Vishal.and P.Mukhil.

Filmography

Web series

Awards and nominations

References

Kannada film directors
Tamil film directors
Living people
Film directors from Chennai
21st-century Indian film directors
Screenwriters from Chennai
Tamil screenwriters
Telugu screenwriters
Kannada screenwriters
1975 births